Major League Soccer (MLS) is the premier professional soccer league in the United States and Canada. The league has 29 teams in 29 stadiums as of the 2023 season: 26 in the United States and 3 in Canada. At the time of the league's inauguration in 1996, MLS teams used multi-purpose stadiums, often shared with National Football League (NFL) or college football teams. Because of lower attendance, these stadiums had rows of seats covered in tarps to limit capacity. Starting in 1999 with the Columbus Crew's construction of Historic Crew Stadium, the league has constructed soccer-specific stadiums which are tailor-made for soccer and which have smaller capacity. Today, the majority of MLS stadiums are soccer-specific stadiums. While the league's early stadiums relied heavily on public financing, several modern soccer-specific stadiums have been majority-funded by clubs and their owners.

The league's soccer-specific stadiums, with the exception of Providence Park in Portland, Oregon, have grass playing surfaces. The remaining stadiums with artificial turf surfaces are mostly used by teams sharing their venues with other sports, including American football.

As with the other major North American sports leagues, the majority of MLS stadiums have sold their naming rights to corporations. BC Place, Citypark, Soldier Field, and Yankee Stadium are the only current MLS stadiums without a corporate-sponsored name. (Citypark is a temporary placeholder name while St. Louis City SC seeks a new stadium naming rights sponsor.)

Stadiums

The following is a list of current primary MLS stadiums.

Future stadiums

The following is a table of future MLS stadiums that are undergoing construction, have been approved for construction, or are existing venues that are planned to be used by a future team.

The New England Revolution have reportedly been in negotiations over a potential site in South Boston.

Former stadiums

The following is a list of former MLS stadiums.

Defunct teams

See also

 List of soccer stadiums in the United States
 List of soccer stadiums in Canada
 List of current Major League Baseball stadiums
 List of current National Football League stadiums
 List of Major League Lacrosse stadiums
 List of National Basketball Association arenas
 List of National Hockey League arenas

Notes

References

Stadiums
 
Major League Soccer
Major League Soccer stadiums